Milica Rožman-Šlibar (born 1932) is a Slovenian-Yugoslavian gymnast. She competed in seven events at the 1952 Summer Olympics.  Previously, she attended the 1948 Olympics as a team reserve member, although she did not compete.  Additionally, she competed at the 1950 World Championships, where she helped her team to a 4th-place finish.

References

External links
 

1932 births
Living people
Slovenian female artistic gymnasts
Olympic gymnasts of Yugoslavia
Gymnasts at the 1952 Summer Olympics
Sportspeople from Ljubljana